Mære is a village in the municipality of Steinkjer in Trøndelag county, Norway. Mære Church is located in this village as well.

History
In the early Viking Age, according to the Sagas, Mære was one of the most important religious ceremonial places, with sacrifices to the Norse gods. Under the medieval church at Mære, traces of preceding heathen hof were found in archeological investigations during the 1960s, the only case in Norway so far of a pre-Christian building being found to have existed on the site of a church.

References

Villages in Trøndelag
Steinkjer